The Shopping Bag Lady is a 1975 American short film directed by Bert Salzman and starring Mildred Dunnock.

Plot summary 
A shopping-bag lady, Annie Lewis (Mildred Dunnock), is viewed as a homeless nobody by two thoughtless teenage girls. After Annie is picked up by the police due to a misunderstanding, one of the girls (Emily) learns to see her as a human being after looking through Annie's possessions (which Emily has salvaged). As a result Emily is more compassionate towards her grandmother, with whom she lives.

Cast 
Mildred Dunnock as Annie Lewis (the Shopping Bag Lady)
 Julie Wakefield as Emily
 Holly Scott as Lucy
Eleanor Phelps as Grandmother
Justine Miceli as Helen
 William Bressant  as Cop
 Debbie Howard as Girl in school
Laura Whyte as Nurse
 Chip Carroll as Martin
 Alice Beardsley as Woman in park

See also
 List of American films of 1975

References

External links

1975 films
1975 drama films
1975 short films
American drama short films
1970s English-language films
1970s American films